Achille Serra (born 16 October 1941 in Rome)  is an Italian policeman, official and politician. He was prefect of Ancona, Palermo, Florence and Rome.

He was a deputy of Forza Italia in Italy during the thirteenth legislature, after which he resigned after being elected to the Senate for the Democratic Party in the general election of 2008.

References

1941 births
Living people
Politicians from Rome
Forza Italia politicians
Democratic Party (Italy) politicians
Union of the Centre (2002) politicians
Deputies of Legislature XIII of Italy
Senators of Legislature XVI of Italy